Treichel is an Alemannic German surname meaning cowbell; it may refer to any one of these persons:

Alexander Johann August Treichel (1837–1901) - German botanist
Hans-Ulrich Treichel (born 1952) - German man of letters
Paul M. Treichel  (born 1936) - American chemist
Tiago Treichel (born 1984) - Brazilian footballer